Brickellia laciniata, the splitleaf brickellbush, is a North American species of flowering plants in the family Asteraceae. It is native to northeastern and north-central Mexico (Chihuahua, Coahuila, Nuevo León, Durango, San Luis Potosí, Tamaulipas, Zacatecas) and the southwestern United States (southern New Mexico, western Texas).

Brickellia laciniata is a shrub up to 120 cm (48 inches) tall. It produces many small flower heads with yellow-green disc florets but no ray florets.

References

laciniata
Flora of Mexico
Flora of the Southwestern United States
Plants described in 1852